Magdalena Bay is an American synth-pop and electronic duo from Miami, Florida, based in Los Angeles, California. The duo consists of singer-songwriter Mica Tenenbaum and producer Matthew Lewin. The duo has released one studio album, three EPs, and two mixtapes, called Mini Mixes, composed of one- to two-minute songs, with accompanying homemade green screen music videos.

The duo released their debut studio album, Mercurial World, on October 8, 2021. They have been noted for their informational TikTok videos on the music industry and their kitschy DIY visuals.

Background 
Tenenbaum was born in Buenos Aires, Argentina, and immigrated with her family to the United States (Miami, FL) when she was one year old, while Lewin (born in Miami, FL) is also of Argentine descent from his father's side. Both Tenenbaum and Lewin are Jewish.  They originally met in high school at a program run by Live! Modern School of Music, where they were placed in a classic rock cover band and later began writing their own progressive rock music as Tabula Rasa.

After that band broke up, they formed Magdalena Bay in 2016 while on vacation from college—Tenenbaum at the University of Pennsylvania in Philadelphia and Lewin at Northeastern University in Boston—and continued to collaborate remotely. They chose the name after an administrator at Lewin's former job, not the bay in Mexico. The duo released their first two EPs, Day/Pop and Night/Pop, in 2019, and signed with indie record label Luminelle Recordings later that year. They have cited Grimes, Chairlift, and Charli XCX as influences.

The duo released their debut studio album, Mercurial World, on October 8, 2021. The album's release was preceded by four singles: "Chaeri", "Secrets (Your Fire)", "You Lose!", and "Hysterical Us". A deluxe version of Mercurial World, which contains fan-submitted "secrets", remixes, and two new songs, was released on September 23, 2022.

Discography

Studio albums

Extended plays

Singles

As lead artist

As featured artist

Music videos

Production discography

References 

2016 establishments in Florida
American electronic music duos
American synth-pop groups
American people of Argentine-Jewish descent
Electronic music groups from Florida
Electropop groups
Indie pop groups from Florida
Jewish American musicians
Jewish musical groups
Musical groups established in 2016
Musical groups from Miami